Aldo-keto reductase family 1 member C1 also known as 20α-hydroxysteroid dehydrogenase, 3α-hydroxysteroid dehydrogenase, and dihydrodiol dehydrogenase 1/2 is an enzyme that in humans is encoded by the AKR1C1 gene.

This gene encodes a member of the aldo/keto reductase superfamily, which consists of more than 40 known enzymes and proteins. These enzymes catalyze the conversion of aldehydes and ketones to their corresponding alcohols by utilizing NADH and/or NADPH as cofactors. The enzymes display overlapping but distinct substrate specificity. This enzyme catalyzes the reduction of progesterone to the inactive form 20-alpha-hydroxy-progesterone. This gene shares high sequence identity with three other gene members, and is clustered with those three genes at chromosome 10p15-p14.

References

External links

Further reading 

 
 
 
 
 
 
 
 
 
 
 
 
 
 
 
 
 

EC 1.1.1